The Laurence Olivier Award for Actor of the Year in a Revival was an annual award presented by the Society of London Theatre in recognition of achievements in commercial London theatre. The awards were established as the Society of West End Theatre Awards in 1976, and renamed in 1984 in honour of English actor and director Laurence Olivier.

This award was presented from 1976 to 1984, then in 1985 the award was combined with the Actor of the Year in a New Play award to create the Best Actor award. The original Actor of the Year in a Revival award returned one last time, for the 1988 ceremony.

Winners and nominees

1970s

1980s

References

External links
 

Actor
Theatre acting awards